Danielle (Ottobre) Imbo and Richard A. Petrone Jr. are an American couple who disappeared together on February 19, 2005, after visiting a bar on Philadelphia's South Street. Their case remains unsolved.

Background 
Imbo, age 34, was a resident of Mt. Laurel, New Jersey, and was separated from her husband at the time of her disappearance. Petrone, age 35, resided in Philadelphia and worked at his family's bakery. The couple had been involved in what family and friends describe as an "on again, off again" romantic relationship. 

On the evening of Saturday, February 19, 2005, Imbo and Petrone joined another couple for drinks at Abeline's bar and restaurant located at 429 South Street in Philadelphia. Witnesses stated that the couple left the bar at about 11:45 p.m. en route to Imbo's New Jersey home. They were last seen walking on South Street toward Petrone's parked vehicle, a 2001 Dodge pick-up truck.

Investigation 
Imbo, Petrone, and their vehicle were not seen again after the night of February 19, 2005. Since their disappearance, there has been no activity on Imbo's or Petrone's cell phones or personal finances. Imbo had a 2-year-old son and Petrone had a teenage daughter. Media accounts state that both had close relationships with their children and families and were unlikely to have voluntarily disappeared.

Since 2008, the FBI has been investigating the disappearance as a possible murder for hire, but has not named any suspects.

In 2021, the disappearance continued to be investigated by the Philadelphia Police Department, New Jersey State Police, Mount Laurel Police Department, and the Burlington County Prosecutor's Office, with the FBI reporting that "an extensive investigation to date has generated some promising leads; however, neither they nor the vehicle have ever been located."

In March 22, 2022, a private search and recovery dive team, Adventures with Purpose, announced they were actively working on the case.

Media depictions 
In 2016, their case was profiled on the podcast The Vanished.

Their case was episode 11 of season 8 of the TV show Disappeared with the episode named "A Bridge Too Far".

Their case was also recapped on the podcast "Obsessed With Disappeared" in August 2022 in an episode titled "A Bridge Too Far: The Disappearance of Danielle Imbo & Richard Petrone".

Their case was featured on the podcast Crime Junkie on May 11, 2020. It was also featured on the podcast Women & Crime in December 2021.

See also 
 List of people who disappeared

Notes

External links 
 “NamUs, MP 806” Namus page for Danielle Imbo
 “NamUs, MP 3968” Namus page for Richard Petrone, Jr. 
 “Danielle Imbo” Danielle Imbo's missing person page.
 ”Richard Petrone Jr.” Richard Petrone's missing person's page.

2000s missing person cases
Couples
Missing person cases in Pennsylvania
Unexplained disappearances